was a Japanese mountaineer and expedition leader. He graduated from Hitotsubashi University. He led the second successful attempt in 1977 to reach the summit of K2 and several other Japanese expeditions. Yoshizawa became a member of the Japanese Alpine Club in 1925 and later also a member of the American Alpine Club.

External links
 Obituary from The American Alpine Journal, 1999

Japanese mountain climbers
Hitotsubashi University alumni
1903 births
1998 deaths